SMART, Scandinavian Multi Access Reservations for Travel Agents, is a computerized system for ticket reservation.

History
It was created in 1979 by SAS, Braathens and Swedish State Railways. Many travel companies had computerized their systems at the time, and provided terminal interfaces for travel agencies. Each had their own system, often involving widely different codes and procedures. It was cumbersome and expensive for a travel agency to have multiple terminals, each one connected to a different provider. SMART solved this, by providing a single interface over the public data network Datex.

It worked by having a Host Interface Processor (HIP) at each travel company. These would emulate a number of terminals, translate the messages, codes and addresses, wrap them in SMARTs own communications protocol, and provide the interface over Datex to the various travel agencies. There was, of course, functionality to limit access.

On the travel agency side, there would be SMART Terminal Equipment (STE) with the reverse function, emulating a server and providing interfaces for terminals. Now however, a travel agent could easily switch between screens for the different companies. The interfaces were similar to those for direct connections, but provided some standardization for codes to ease the transition between the systems.

The STE would also allow printing of documents, tickets, bills and similar, as well as interfacing with the accounting system.

SMART could utilize some of Datex extra features like queuing and group numbers, and a logical connection (session) was not dependent on the physical connection (which could go up and down for instance during idle times to save money). Parallel sessions could be held with different or the same provider.

SMART spawned off into a company centered in Stockholm in 1984, SMART AB, with the subsidiaries SMART Sverige AB, SMART Danmark A/S, and SMART Norge AS (in Sweden, Denmark and Norway respectively).

SMART is still in use, though not over Datex. It has been widely replaced by Amadeus, by the same company. In 2003, SMART AB changed its name to Amadeus Scandinavia.

See also
 Travel technology

References

Scandinavia
Travel technology